"Morning Dance" is the title of an instrumental recording by the noted smooth jazz/jazz fusion band Spyro Gyra. Songwriter and band member Jay Beckenstein plays the alto sax on this track, and it features a memorable tenor steel pan.

Charts

See also
List of number-one adult contemporary singles of 1979 (U.S.)

References

1979 singles
1970s instrumentals
Spyro Gyra songs